Alma-Tadema is a surname. Notable people with the surname include:

 Lawrence Alma-Tadema (1836–1912), Dutch painter
 Laura Theresa Alma-Tadema (1852–1909), English painter and second wife of Sir Lawrence
 Laurence Alma-Tadema (1865–1940), novelist and poet; Sir Lawrence's first daughter
 Anna Alma-Tadema (1867–1943), painter; Sir Lawrence's second daughter

See also
 Steinway Alma Tadema, a special version of the Steinway D-274 concert piano, designed by Sir Lawrence

Compound surnames